Brookula kerguelensis is a species of sea snail, a marine gastropod mollusk, unassigned in the superfamily Seguenzioidea.

Description
The shell reaches a height of 1.6 mm.

Distribution
This species occurs in the Southern Indian Ocean off the Kerguelen Islands.

References

External links
 To World Register of Marine Species

 kerguelensis
Gastropods described in 1925